This is a list of Cypriot football transfers for the 2009–10 winter transfer window by club. Only transfers of clubs in the Cypriot First Division and Cypriot Second Division are included.

The winter transfer window opened on 1 January 2010, although a few transfers took place prior to that date. The window closed at midnight on 31 January 2010. Players without a club may join one at any time, either during or in between transfer windows.

Marfin Laiki League

AEL Limassol

In:

Out:

AEP Paphos

In:

Out:

Anorthosis

In:

Out:

APEP Pitsilia

In:

Out:

APOEL

In:

Out:

Apollon Limassol

In:

Out:

APOP Kinyras Peyias

In:

Out:

Aris Limassol

In:

Out:

Doxa Katokopia

In:

Out:

Enosis Neon Paralimni

In:

Out:

Ermis Aradippou

In:

Out:

Ethnikos Achna

In:

Out:

Nea Salamina

In:

Out:

Omonia

In:

Out:

Cypriot Second Division

AEK Larnaca

In:

Out:

Akritas Chlorakas

In:

Out:

Alki Larnaca

In:

Out:

ASIL

In:

Out:

Atromitos Yeroskipou

In:

Out:

Ayia Napa F.C.

In:

Out:

Digenis Akritas Morphou

In:

Out:

Frenaros FC 2000

In:

Out:

MEAP Nisou

In:

Out:

Olympiakos Nicosia

In:

Out:

Omonia Aradippou

In:

Out:

Onisilos Sotira

In:

Out:

Othellos Athienou F.C.

In:

Out:

PAEEK FC

In:

Out:

References

See also
List of Belgian football transfers winter 2009–10
List of Danish football transfers winter 2009–10
List of English football transfers winter 2009–10
List of French football transfers winter 2010
List of German football transfers winter 2009–10
List of Italian football transfers winter 2009–10
List of Latvian football transfers winter 2009–10
List of Maltese football transfers winter 2009–10
List of Serbian football transfers winter 2009–10
List of Spanish football transfers winter 2009–10
List of Swedish football transfers winter 2009–2010

Cypriot
Transfers
2009-10